Stillingia parvifolia is a species of flowering plant in the family Euphorbiaceae. It was described in 1989. It is native to Peru.

References

parvifolia
Plants described in 1989
Flora of Peru